Íþróttafélag Hafnarfjarðar, commonly known as ÍH, is an Icelandic sports club from the town of Hafnarfjörður. It was founded in 1983 as a handball club but later fielded other sports departments, such as in football and basketball.

References

External links
Profile on Football Association of Iceland

Multi-sport clubs in Iceland
Football clubs in Iceland